Hasvåg is a seaside village in the municipality of Flatanger in Trøndelag county, Norway. The village is located at the end of the Hasvågøya peninsula in the far southwestern edge of Flatanger.  The village has about fifty inhabitants.

On 28 January 2014, a lightning strike caused a wildfire to spread across the heather fields surrounding the village.  The fire destroyed the majority of the houses in Hasvåg, but no one lost their lives.

References

External links
Aerial view of the village in 2014

Villages in Trøndelag
Flatanger